Ivo Karlović was the defending champion, but chose not to participate that year.

Seventh-seeded Marcel Granollers Pujol won in the final 6–4, 1–6, 7–5, against James Blake.

Seeds

Draw

Finals

Top half

Bottom half

External links
 Draw
 Qualifying draw

Singles